Sheila Dorothy King, CD (born 1932) was a Barbadian-born, Jamaican academic and physician. She was the second woman to be appointed as full professor at the University of the West Indies (UWI). She was the first woman appointed as a professor in the Faculty of Medicine in 1983, ten years after she was appointed as head of UWI's Microbiology Department. A specialist in infectious disease and viral epidemiology, she advised numerous national, regional and international departments and governmental agencies on such diseases as dengue, influenza, and typhoid. In 1998, she was honored as a Commander of the Order of Distinction.

Early life
Sheila Dorothy King, known as Dorothy, was born in 1932, in Barbados to Henrietta Adina (née Stuart) and Alfred T. King. She grew up in Barbados and completed her secondary education at Queen's College in Bridgetown, before enrolling in medical school at the University College of the West Indies in Mona, Jamaica. In 1958, King graduated with a Bachelor of Medicine, Bachelor of Surgery and on the day of her graduation became engaged to fellow medical student, Hugh Hastings Wynter. The two were assigned to complete their internship at the University College Hospital in the obstetrics and gynecology department. On 28 December 1959, at the chapel on the UWI campus, King and Wynter married.

Career
Over the next four years,, King worked in various rotations including as Casualty Officer, House Officer in Medicine, House Officer of Obstetrics and Gynaecology and Senior House Officer in Paediatrics at the University College Hospital, and she had two sons, Shaun and David. In 1961, she was appointed as an assistant Lecturer in the Department of Microbiology at UWI. That same year, leaving her children in Jamaica with their grandparents, King relocated to England and enrolled in post-graduate studies at the University of London. She graduated with her Postgraduate Diploma in bacteriology in 1964 and went on to earn her Membership in the Royal College of Pathology at the University of London, before returning home to resume her post at UWI.

Besides her teaching, King conducted research on viral diseases. In 1968, she was involved in a vaccine study to inoculate Jamaican school children at risk for the rubella virus with a weakened strain of live virus. In 1970, King was granted tenure and three years later she was made Head of the Department of Microbiology. Simultaneously, in 1973, she began working as the supervisor for the Ministry of Health’s Typhoid Carrier Surveillance Programme. The following year she was appointed to the advisory board of the Trinidad Virus Laboratory and became an advisor to the Pan American Health Organization (PAHO)'s Committee on Dengue in the Americas. In 1977, a dengue epidemic swept through Jamaica, soon spreading throughout the Caribbean and to the American mainland. King and Dr. Esmie Rose, who headed the Virology Department directed the investigation to identify the virus and develop a plan to control the virus. Their findings were presented at a conference held in Montego Bay 8–11 May 1978.

King also made studies of the rotavirus and the role they played in the development of gastroenteritis, typhoid, meningitis, and Hepatitis B and was a prolific publisher and presenter at international conferences on regional infectious disease. From 1981, had additional responsibilities as Director of the Jamaican Influenza Center for the WHO and on the Advisory Board for the Caribbean Epidemiological Center (CAREC). In 1983, after a decade heading the Department of Microbiology, and earning her Doctor of Medicine degree from the University of London, King was made a full professor. The appointment was only the second full professorship ever granted to a woman in UWI's history and was the first time a woman had been elevated to the position in the faculty of medicine.  To recognize her achievement, King was awarded the Medal of Appreciation by the Prime Minister that same year. In 1998, she was honored by the government of Jamaica as a Commander in the Order of Distinction and that same year conducted research into a virulent strain of the influenza virus which was prevalent on the island. King retired from UWI in 2001.

Selected works

References

Citations

Bibliography

1932 births
Living people
Alumni of the University of London
Alumni of University of London Worldwide
Barbadian women
Caribbean people of African descent
Jamaican microbiologists
University of the West Indies academics
University of the West Indies alumni
Women microbiologists